Hoodia currorii is a succulent plant native to Namibia and the Cape Province of South Africa.  It grows in desert areas and is common along the road from Karibib to Swakopmund in Namibia. It is also known as ghaap in the vernacular.

Description 
Hoodia currorii grows in erect clumps with gray-green stems, 8 centimeters in diameter. It reaches heights of 50 to 80 centimeters tall. It bears rust-red flowers mid-summer which are covered in purple hairs. These are large flowers, about five to ten centimeters in diameter.

Cultivation 
Hoodia currorii is more commonly seen cultivated than other Hoodia species. It can be grown from cuttings.

Uses 
Hoodia currorii may be eaten after the spines are removed and is said to have a sweet flavor.

References 

Flora of Southern Africa
currorii
Edible plants